This article is about the particular significance of the year 1886 to Wales and its people.

Incumbents
Lord Lieutenant of Anglesey – Richard Davies 
Lord Lieutenant of Brecknockshire – Joseph Bailey, 1st Baron Glanusk
Lord Lieutenant of Caernarvonshire – Edward Douglas-Pennant, 1st Baron Penrhyn (until 31 March); John Ernest Greaves (from 17 May)
Lord Lieutenant of Cardiganshire – Edward Pryse
Lord Lieutenant of Carmarthenshire – John Campbell, 2nd Earl Cawdor
Lord Lieutenant of Denbighshire – William Cornwallis-West    
Lord Lieutenant of Flintshire – Hugh Robert Hughes 
Lord Lieutenant of Glamorgan – Christopher Rice Mansel Talbot 
Lord Lieutenant of Merionethshire – Robert Davies Pryce 
Lord Lieutenant of Monmouthshire – Henry Somerset, 8th Duke of Beaufort
Lord Lieutenant of Montgomeryshire – Edward Herbert, 3rd Earl of Powis
Lord Lieutenant of Pembrokeshire – William Edwardes, 4th Baron Kensington
Lord Lieutenant of Radnorshire – Arthur Walsh, 2nd Baron Ormathwaite

Bishop of Bangor – James Colquhoun Campbell 
Bishop of Llandaff – Richard Lewis
Bishop of St Asaph – Joshua Hughes
Bishop of St Davids – Basil Jones

Archdruid of the National Eisteddfod of Wales – Clwydfardd

Events
9 June – Soprano Adelina Patti marries tenor Ernesto Nicolini in south Wales.
1 September – The Great Western Railway opens the Severn Tunnel to regular goods and mineral traffic (and to passengers on 1 December).
September – Opening of the Llandudno Pier Pavilion Theatre.
15 October
20 people are drowned when the sailing ship Malleny is wrecked on Tusker Rocks, Porthcawl.
18 people are drowned when the sailing ship Teviotdale is wrecked on Cefn Sidan Sands in Carmarthenshire.
16 October
Statue of the Liberal politician John Batchelor unveiled in Cardiff
November
Serious flooding in Aberystwyth.
The keeper of the Mumbles lighthouse is swept out to sea and drowned.
The rivers Mawddach, Dee and Taff all flood.
Cantref Reservoir on the Taff Fawr is completed.
Opening of the Cardiff Stock Exchange.
Cymru Fydd is founded by the Liberal Party to further the cause of home rule.
The Welsh Land League is founded.
Beginning of the tithe revolt in Denbighshire.
The corporation of the Borough of Holt is dissolved.

Arts and literature

Awards
National Eisteddfod of Wales – held at Caernarfon
Chair – Richard Davies, "Gobaith"
Crown – John Cadfan Davies

New books
Rhoda Broughton – Doctor Cupid

Music
William Owen "of Prysgol" – Y Perl Cerddorol yn cynnwys tonau ac anthemau, cysegredig a moesol (sol-fa edition)

Sport
Football – Druids win the Welsh Cup for the fifth time in its nine-year history.
Rugby union – Abercynon RFC and Treorchy RFC are founded.

Births
3 March – Jack Jones, Wales international rugby player (died 1951)
4 March – Rowland Griffiths, Wales international rugby player (died 1914)
5 March – Freddie Welsh, Lightweight boxing champion of the world (died 1927)
14 March – David Watts, Wales international rugby union player (died 1916)
16 March – James Llewellyn Davies, VC winner (died 1917)
28 March – John Osborn Williams, entrepreneur (died 1963)
3 May – Morgan Jones, Welsh politician (died 1939)
4 May – Olive Wheeler, educationalist (died 1963)
6 June – John Morgan, Archbishop of Wales (died 1957)
17 June – David Brunt, meteorologist (died 1965)
11 July – Ernest Willows, aviation pioneer (died 1926)
13 July – Huw Menai (Huw Owen Williams), poet (died 1961)
22 September – Bil Perry, Welsh international rugby player (died 1970)
29 September – Jack Williams, VC recipient (died 1953)
9 November (probably) – S. O. Davies, politician (died 1972)
10 November – Fred Birt, Wales international rugby union player (died 1956)
22 December – David James Jones, philosopher and academic (died 1947)

Deaths
28 February – John Jones, politician, 73
12 March – Edward Arthur Somerset, politician, 69
31 March – Edward Douglas-Pennant, 1st Baron Penrhyn, 85
7 May – Timothy Richards Lewis, surgeon and pathologist, 44
9 June – Edward Williams, iron-master, 60)
9 July – Roger Edwards, minister and writer, 75
13 October – John Prichard, architect, 69
29 October – Evan Evans, ("Evans Bach Nantyglo"), minister, 82

References

 
Wales